Pusdil was a Sasanian prince—he was the son of Khosrow II (r. 590-628), and together with most of his brothers and half-brothers were executed in 628 by Kavadh II (r. 628), another son of Khosrow II. According to the Iranian historian al-Tabari, Pusdil and the rest of his executed brothers and half-brothers were "all well-educated, valiant, and chivalrous men".

Sources

External links 
The Sasanid rulers of Persia (detailed genealogy)

7th-century Iranian people
628 deaths
Year of birth unknown
Sasanian princes
People executed by the Sasanian Empire
Executed royalty